Walter Bryce Gallie (5 October 1912 – 31 August 1998) was a Scottish social theorist, political theorist, and philosopher.

Career

Early life
Gallie was born in Lenzie, East Dunbartonshire, near Glasgow, the son of an engineer. He worked as a classics teacher at Sedbergh School between the wars and later published his memoirs of this in the book An English School.

Military career
He served in the British Army from 1940 to 1945, leaving the service with the rank of major. He was awarded the Croix de Guerre.

Academic career
Gallie was became an Assistant Lecturer in Philosophy at University College of Swansea in 1935, a Lecturer in Philosophy at University College of Swansea in 1938 and Senior Lecturer in Philosophy at University College of Swansea in 1948. He moved on to become Professor of Philosophy at University College of North Staffordshire in 1950, Professor of Logic and Metaphysics at Queen's University, Belfast in 1954 and Professor of Political Science at Cambridge University 1967. He was also a fellow of Peterhouse from 1967 to 1978.

In Gallie's paper on 'Essentially contested concepts', he argued that it is impossible to conclusively define key appraisive concepts such as 'social justice,' 'democracy,' 'Christian life', 'art', 'moral goodness' and 'duty', although it is possible and rational to discuss one's justifications for holding one interpretation over competing ones.  Clarification of such concepts involves not the examination of predictive relations (as is the case for most scientific concepts), but rather, consideration of how the concept has been used by different parties throughout its history.

Personal life and death
Gallie married Menna Patricia Humphreys in 1940. They had a son and a daughter.

He died in Cardigan, Ceredigion, on 31 August 1998.

Works
 1939: "An Interpretation of Causal Laws", Mind Vol.48, No.192, pp. 409–426.
 1949: An English School, Cresset Press.
 1952: Peirce and Pragmatism, Penguin Books, (Harmondsworth).
 1954: "The Function of Philosophical Aesthetics", pp. 13–35 in Elton, W.R., Aesthetics and Language: Essays by W. B. Gallie and Others, Basil Blackwell.
 1955: "Explanations in History and the Genetic Sciences", Mind, Vol.64, No.254, pp. 160–180.
 1955: "Essentially Contested Concepts", Proceedings of the Aristotelian Society, Vol.56, (1956), pp. 167–198.
 1956: "Art as an Essentially Contested Concept", The Philosophical Quarterly Vol.6, No.23, pp. 97–114.
 1957: Free Will and Determinism Yet Again: An Inaugural Lecture Delivered on 15 May 1957 at the Queen's University of Belfast, Marjory Boyd, (Belfast).
 1957: "What Makes a Subject Scientific?", The British Journal for the Philosophy of Science 8(30): 118–139.
 1957: "The Lords' Debate on Hanging July 1956: Interpretation and Comment", Philosophy, Vol.32, No.121, pp. 132–147.
 1960: A New University: A. D. Lindsay and the Keele Experiment, Chatto & Windus.
 1964: Philosophy and the Historical Understanding, Chatto & Windus, (London).
 "Narrative and Historical Understanding" [reprint of "The Historical Understanding" (1964), pp. 40–51 in Roberts, G. (ed), The History and Narrative Reader, Routledge, (London), 2001.
 1968: Philosophy and the Historical Understanding, 2nd ed. Schocken Books.
 1968: "The Idea of Practice", Proceedings of the Aristotelian Society 68: 63–86.
 1973: "Wanted: A Philosophy of International Relations", Political Studies 27(3): 484–492.
 1978: Philosophers of Peace and War: Kant, Clausewitz, Marx, Engels and Tolstoy [The Wiles Lectures, delivered at Belfast University in May 1976], Cambridge University Press.
 1979: "Kant's View of Reason in Politics", Philosophy, Vol.54, No.207, pp. 19–33.
 1983: How to Think about Nuclear Weapons: J.R. Jones Memorial Lecture Delivered at the College on 26 April 1983, University College of Swansea.
 1991: Understanding War: An Essay on the Nuclear Age, Routledge, (London).

References

Further reading
 Anon, "Obituary Notice: Walter Bryce Gallie", Cambridge University Reporter, 7 October 1998.
 Harrah, D., "Gallie and the Scientific Tradition", The British Journal for the Philosophy of Science, Vol.10, No.39, (November 1959), pp. 234–239.
 Montefiore, A., "Professor Gallie on Necessary and Sufficient Conditions", Mind, New Series, Vol.65, No.260, (October 1956), pp. 534–541.

Scottish political philosophers
Scottish political scientists
1912 births
1998 deaths
Academics of Keele University
Academics of Queen's University Belfast
Academics of Swansea University
Fellows of Peterhouse, Cambridge
Historiographers
People from Lenzie
Presidents of the Aristotelian Society
20th-century British historians
20th-century British philosophers
20th-century political scientists